Sunday Surprise: 4 Mani – Nanga Than Ini is a 2018 Tamil language weekly programming segment that will feature the world television premieres of eight feature films on Zee Tamil HD from 4 February 2018 on every Sunday at 16:00 (IST).

List of films

References

External links
 Zee Tamizh Official website

2010s Tamil-language television series
2018 Tamil-language television series debuts
Tamil-language television shows